James Henry "Truck" Cullom (November 5, 1925 – March 4, 1998) was an American football guard in the National Football League (NFL) for the New York Yanks.

Cullom served in the United States Marine Corps during World War II. After the war, he played college football at the University of California, where he was a three-year lineman and placekicker from 1947–49, playing on two of coach Pappy Waldorf's Rose Bowl teams.  Cullom was a first-team All-Coast tackle in 1949, and also played on Cal's rugby team.

Cullom was drafted in the 24th round of the 1949 NFL Draft and again in the seventeenth round of the 1950 NFL Draft by the Washington Redskins.  After one season playing for the New York Yanks, he was recalled by the Marines and was wounded in the Korean War.  Cullom later returned to Cal where he worked as an assistant coach for both the football and rugby teams.

Cullom was inducted into the University of California Athletic Hall of Fame in 1995.

References

1925 births
1998 deaths
American football offensive guards
California Golden Bears football players
New York Yanks players
People from Healdsburg, California
Sportspeople from the San Francisco Bay Area
Players of American football from California
United States Marine Corps personnel of World War II